Oden is a large Swedish icebreaker, built in 1988 for the Swedish Maritime Administration. It is named after the Norse god Odin. First built to clear a passage through the ice of the Gulf of Bothnia for cargo ships, it was later modified to serve as a research vessel. Equipped with its own helicopter and manned by 15 crew members it has ample capacity to carry laboratory equipment and 80 passengers, functioning independently in harsh Polar ice packs of the Arctic and Antarctic seas. It was the first non-nuclear surface vessel to reach the North Pole (in 1991), together with the German research icebreaker Polarstern. It has participated in several scientific expeditions in Arctic and Antarctica.

Expeditions

Oden Antarctic Expedition 2007

The joint project was a co-operative endeavor between the Swedish Polar Research Secretariat and the U.S. National Science Foundation (NSF) to collect a range of data in rarely traveled areas of the Antarctic seas and coastline. The international research team studied the oceanography and bio-geochemistry of the region, with emphasis on the processes that control the growth and fate of phytoplankton in the ocean.

Oden Antarctic Expedition 2008

From 25 November 2008 to 12 January 2009, an international research team participated in an expedition onboard Oden, collecting a range of data in rarely traveled areas of the Antarctic seas and coastline, including the Amundsen and eastern Ross Seas. They studied production and destruction of greenhouse gases and their effects on sea ice microorganisms. The study was designed to allow future researchers to better understand and monitor the Antarctic region.

Oden Southern Ocean Expedition 2009

Oden was in Antarctica during the southern summer 2009-2010.

Oden Antarctic Expedition 2010

Oden was in Antarctica between 4 December 2010 and 20 January 2011. The expedition investigated the ice, biology, oceanography, and biogeochemistry of the Amundsen Sea Polynya. There was a controversy that Oden was not assisting the shipping in Swedish waters, which had problems in the unusually cold winter. The Swedish government decided to keep Oden at home for the season 2011-2012 which turned out to be unusually mild.

Synoptic Arctic Survey 2021
In August and September 2021 Oden conducted a major Arctic cruise to study the status and change of the Arctic ecosystem. The cruise concluded on 20 September 2021 when Oden arrived at the southern Swedish port of Helsingborg.

Other

Oden has participated in numerous scientific expeditions in the Canadian arctic archipelago. In 2016 Oden accompanied  on an undersea mapping expedition to the Canadian Arctic.

References

External links 

Swedish Maritime Administration pdf describing Oden
Article on Antarctic Research featuring Oden. Science, 19 August 2011.

Icebreakers of Sweden
Ships of Sweden
1988 ships
North Pole